Chris Rodriguez may refer to:
Chris Rodriguez (singer), singer/songwriter
Chris Rodriguez (baseball, born 1976), baseball manager
Chris Rodriguez (pitcher), baseball pitcher
Chris Rodriguez Jr., American football running back